College Bayside is a Metromover station in Downtown, Miami, Florida, adjacent to the Wolfson Campus of Miami Dade College and one block west of the Bayside Marketplace.

This station is located at Northeast Third Street and Second Avenue. It opened to service April 17, 1986 and is the last station to transfer directly to the Omni Loop.

Station layout

Places of interest
Miami Dade College (Wolfson Campus)
Bayside Marketplace 
Hard Rock Cafe 
 Tropicalsailing 
Hooters
 Off the Hookah
 Middle East Grill
 Fat Tuesday
Lombardi's Restaurante 
Bubba Gump Shrimp Co. 
Los Ranchos of Bayside 
Island Queen Cruises
Bayside Plaza Office Building 
Vizcayne
New World School of the Arts
School for Advanced Studies 
The Loft 2
Loft Miami
Loft 3
200 Third Street Building
Holiday Inn Port of Miami-Downtown Hotel

External links
 
 MDT – Metromover Stations
 3rd Street entrance from Google Maps Street View
 4th Street entrance from Google Maps Street View

Metromover stations
Railway stations in the United States opened in 1986
1986 establishments in Florida
Brickell Loop
Inner Loop
Omni Loop